Menšík (feminine Menšíková) is a Czech and Slovak surname. Notable people with the surname include:

 Eric Mensik, American football player
 Jakub Menšík, Czech tennis player
 Pavel Menšík, Czech rower
 Vladimír Menšík, Czech actor
 Wolfram Menschick, German church musician

Czech-language surnames
Slovak-language surnames